Albacete is a province in the autonomous community of Castile–La Mancha, Spain. It is divided into 87 municipalities. According to the 2011 Spanish Census, the province is the 36th largest by population with  inhabitants but is the ninth largest by land area spanning .

Each municipality forms part of a province which in turn forms part or the whole of an autonomous community. The organisation of the municipalities is governed by a 2 April 1985 law, completed by the 18 April 1986 royal decree. The Statutes of Autonomy of the various autonomous communities also contain provisions concerning the relations between the municipalities and the autonomous governments. In general, municipalities enjoy a large degree of autonomy in their local affairs: many of the functions of the comarcas and provinces are municipal powers pooled together. Each municipality is a corporation with independent legal personality: its governing body is called the ayuntamiento (municipal council or corporation), a term often also used to refer to the municipal offices (city and town halls). The ayuntamiento is composed of the mayor (Spanish: alcalde), the deputy mayors (Spanish: tenientes de alcalde) and the plenary assembly (pleno) of councillors (concejales). The mayor and the deputy mayors are elected by the plenary assembly, which is itself elected by universal suffrage on a list system every four years. The plenary assembly must meet publicly at least every three months at the seat of the ayuntamiento. Many ayuntamientos also have a governing commission (comisión de gobierno), named by the mayor from among the councillors; it is required for municipalities of more than 5,000 inhabitants. The governing commission, whose role is to assist the mayor between meetings of the plenary assembly, may not include more than one third of the councillors.

The largest municipality by population in Albacete is Albacete, with 171,999 residents, and the smallest municipality  is Villa de Ves with 54 residents. The largest municipality by area is also the municipality of Albacete which spans 1234.00 km², while Cotillas is the smallest at 18.42 km².

Municipalities 

<onlyinclude>

See also
Geography of Spain
List of Spanish cities

References

Albacete